Neoxenicotela mausoni is a species of beetle in the family Cerambycidae, and the only species in the genus Neoxenicotela. It was described by Breuning in 1947.

References

Lamiini
Beetles described in 1947